Louis Baunard was a rector of the Catholic University of Lille and historian.

Biography 

This great educator, was born at Bellegarde-en-Gâtinais (Loiret), France, the 24 of August 1828, and died in the departement of Nord, in Gruson the 9 of November 1919. He was one of the clergy of Orléans, until 1877, after which he was attached to the Catholic University of Lille, first as professor, and later as rector. No Catholic university profited more by the Law of 1875 that granted freedom of higher education.

Monsignor Baunard received the degree of Doctor of Letters, in 1860. In the two theses which he wrote he treated of the pedagogy of Plato and of Theodulphus, Bishop of Orléans in the time of Charlemagne; both works which marked the beginning of a literary activity surpassed by few. As hagiographer he wrote on St. John the Apostle (1869) and St. Ambrose (1871). He wrote the biographies of Saint Louise de Marillac, the foundress of the Daughters of Charity (1898); of (Madame) Saint Madeleine Sophie  Barat (1876), foundress of the Ladies of the Sacred Heart; of Vicomte Armand de Melun (1880), Cardinal Pie, Bishop of Poitiers (1886), Cardinal Lavigerie (1896), Ernest Lelièvre, co-founder of the Little Sisters of the Poor (1905), and Philibert Vrau, the great Christian manufacturer (1906). The French religious history of the nineteenth century was summarized by him in "un siècle de l'Eglise de France" (1901). He contributed notable works of religious psychology in his celebrated books, "Le doute et ses victimes" (1865), and "La foi et ses victoires" (1881-83). His "Espérance" (1892) throws much light on the beginnings of the contemporary religious revival among intelligent Frenchmen at the end of the nineteenth century; his "L'évangile du pauvre" (1905) appeared opportunely during a period of social unrest.

Books 
 Histoire du cardinal Pie : évêque de Poitiers, H. Oudin, Poitiers, 1886)
 Histoire de la vénérable Mère Madeleine-Sophie Barat, fondatrice de la Société du Sacré-Cœur de Jésus, Librairie Poussièlgue Frères, 1ère édition en 1877, 4e édition en 1879
 Le Général de Sonis d'après ses papiers et sa correspondance, Poussielgue, Paris, 1890
 Le cardinal Lavigerie, éd. Ch. Poussielgue, Paris, 1896
 Théodulfe, évêque d'Orléans et Abbé de Fleury-sur-Loire, Orléans, 1860.

References

Year of birth missing
Year of death missing
French Roman Catholic priests